04 is the fourth studio album by South Korean trio, Urban Zakapa, consisting of 9 tracks. The album was released on November 4, 2014.

Background and release
Fluxus Music announced the group's fourth studio album in October 2014, releasing a 36-second teaser video on October 30. A pre-released track titled "Consolation" had its music video released a day before the album, which was released on November 4. The album contains 9 tracks, including the song "Like A Bird" which was released in May as a single. The album's title track, "Self-hatred", also had its music video released on November 7. It features actor Goo Won.

"Consolation" and "Self-Hatred" ranked at 21 and 69 on the Gaon Singles Chart respectively on the first week of the album's release.

Track listing

Charts

Sales and certifications

References

2014 albums
Genie Music albums
Urban Zakapa albums